The Midnight Ghost Train was an American rock band from Topeka, Kansas, United States. The band’s line-up consisted of Steve Moss (guitar/vocals), Brandon Burghart (drums), and Mike Boyne (bass). The trio has been categorized as hard rock, stoner rock, and heavy blues. TMGT consistently toured the U.S. and Europe from their formation in 2008 to their separation in 2018. Their energetic live show being the staple of the band. They were signed to the Austrian based label, Napalm Records.

The Midnight Ghost Train is coming back for a European Reunion Tour in June 2022!

History
The Midnight Ghost Train was originally formed by Steve Moss in Buffalo, New York. The band's name comes partially from a Hank William's song lyric in I'm So Lonesome I Could Cry. TMGT's first release was "Johnny Boy EP" in 2008, and in 2009 they self-released their first full length album which was self-titled. The album was self-recorded in their home studio after the band relocated to Kansas. They followed up with their 2012 album "Buffalo", released on Karate Body Records. It was recorded entirely analog by Dave Barbe in Athens, Georgia. Displaying the band's delta blues influences, the album features a Lead Belly cover of Cotton Fields done a cappella. In 2013, TMGT performed at the Roadburn Festival in Tilburg, Netherlands, and released "Live at Roadburn 2013" shortly thereafter. After losing their previous bass player, they went through several lineup changes before finding permanent bassist Mike Boyne. In 2014, TMGT signed with the Austrian based metal label, Napalm Records, which released TMGT's "Cold Was The Ground" on February 28, 2015. The album had a much faster tempo than previous releases, with more emphasis on song construction. The release boosted their popularity allowing them to appear at major festivals such as Hellfest and Graspop Metal Meeting. Napalm released their fourth full length album "Cypress Ave." on July 28, 2017. Once again progressing into a more mature sound with a wide array of genres. Including a hip hop track featuring Sonny Cheeba from Camp Lo. TMGT has been most commonly described as hard rock, and related to bands like Kyuss, Black Sabbath, and Clutch. The band built the majority of their fan base from consistent touring, and exciting live performances. In 2018, TMGT called it quits in order to focus more on family life, after playing their last show at the Maryland Doom Fest.

Members
 Steve Moss – vocals, guitar
 Brandon Burghart – drums
 Mike Boyne - bass

Former members

 Alfred Jordan III - bass (2012, 2017)

 Tyler Harper - bass (2018)
 David Kimmell - bass (2010–2012)

Discography
 The Johnny Boy EP (2008)
 The Midnight Ghost Train (2009)
 Buffalo (2012)
 Live at Roadburn 2013 (2013)
 Cold Was the Ground (2015)
 Cypress Ave. (2017)

References

External links 
 

2008 establishments in Kansas
American hard rock musical groups
Musical groups established in 2008
Rock music groups from Kansas
American stoner rock musical groups